Sean Patrick Burroughs (born September 12, 1980) is an American former professional baseball third baseman, who played in Major League Baseball (MLB) for the San Diego Padres, Tampa Bay Devil Rays, Arizona Diamondbacks, and Minnesota Twins. He batted left-handed and threw right-handed.

Early life
Burroughs is the son of former major leaguer Jeff Burroughs and was born in Atlanta, when his father was a member of the Atlanta Braves. He starred in the Little League World Series as a pitcher when he was growing up in Long Beach, California, winning the championship in 1992 and 1993. He is the first American-born player to throw back-to-back no-hitters in the Little League World Series (Ching-Hui Huang of 1973 Tainan, Taiwan threw a perfect game in the first round, and no-hitter in the championship game as the Taiwanese team did not allow a hit in the entire LLWS).

Career

San Diego Padres
The San Diego Padres selected Burroughs in the first round, with the ninth overall selection, of the 1998 MLB draft.

In 2000, Burroughs appeared in the All-Star Futures Game, and was named the game's most valuable player.

Burroughs first joined the Padres in 2002. He hit a game-winning single in the first game played at San Diego's Petco Park and a near-division clinching double off San Francisco's Armando Benítez in 2005.

Tampa Bay Devil Rays
Burroughs's career fell apart during the 2006 season, after being traded to the Tampa Bay Devil Rays in exchange for Dewon Brazelton. Burroughs would bat just .190 in limited playing time before being optioned to the Durham Bulls, Tampa Bay's Triple-A affiliate. Burroughs was designated for assignment on June 22, ending his tenure with the Devil Rays franchise.

Seattle Mariners
On December 24, 2006, Burroughs signed a minor league contract with the Seattle Mariners, but was released on June 15, 2007, less than halfway through the season.

Out of Baseball 
Burroughs struggled with injuries after a collision at second base at Dodger Stadium, culminating in a period in which he was out of baseball. As a result, he did not play baseball at all from 2008–2010. He had a comeback with the Arizona Diamondbacks in 2011.

Arizona Diamondbacks
On November 22, 2010, Burroughs signed a minor league contract with the Arizona Diamondbacks. He had his contract purchased by Arizona on May 18, 2011, after four seasons out of the major leagues. He was placed on waivers on June 19, after hitting .261 for Arizona and outrighted to the minor leagues. After third baseman Melvin Mora was released, Burroughs was promoted back to Arizona on July 1, 2011 where he returned to the starting line-up. He had some key hits which helped the team reach the playoffs. He declared free agency on October 21.

Minnesota Twins
On December 14, 2011, he signed a minor league contract with the Minnesota Twins. He made the major league team in spring training. In October 2012, Burroughs elected minor league free agency.

Los Angeles Dodgers
On April 12, 2013, he signed a minor league contract with the Los Angeles Dodgers and reported to the AA Chattanooga Lookouts. He played in 57 games for the Lookouts and hit .220.

Independent leagues
Burroughs signed with the Bridgeport Bluefish of the Atlantic League of Professional Baseball for 2014 season. He resigned with the Bluefish for the 2015 season.
 On August 8, 2015, Burroughs was traded to the rival Long Island Ducks for Outfielder Bryan Sabatella.

On August 1, 2016, Burroughs was reacquired by the Bridgeport Bluefish for Pitcher D. J. Mitchell. On November 1, 2017, Burroughs was drafted by the Long Island Ducks in the Bridgeport Bluefish dispersal draft. He became a free agent after the 2017 season.

References

External links

Sean Burroughs at Pura Pelota (Venezuelan Professional Baseball League)

1980 births
Living people
Arizona Diamondbacks players
Baseball players at the 2000 Summer Olympics
Baseball players from Atlanta
Bravos de Margarita players
Bridgeport Bluefish players
Chattanooga Lookouts players
Durham Bulls players
Fort Wayne Wizards players
Long Island Ducks players
Major League Baseball third basemen
Minnesota Twins players
Mobile BayBears players
Olympic gold medalists for the United States in baseball
Portland Beavers players
Rancho Cucamonga Quakes players
Reno Aces players
Rochester Red Wings players
San Diego Padres players
Baseball players from Long Beach, California
Tacoma Rainiers players
Tampa Bay Devil Rays players
Tiburones de La Guaira players
American expatriate baseball players in Venezuela
Medalists at the 2000 Summer Olympics
Wilson Classical High School alumni